Adrian Frank Bennett (21 January 1933 – 9 May 2006) was an Australian politician. Born in Perth, Western Australia, he was educated at Catholic schools before becoming a transport worker. He was secretary of the Transport Workers' Union and also sat on the councils of Canning Shire and its successor Canning Town. In 1969, he was elected to the Australian House of Representatives as the Labor member for Swan, defeating sitting Liberal member Richard Cleaver. He held the seat until his defeat in 1975. Bennett died in 2006.

In later life he was a follower of the American conspiracy theorist Lyndon LaRouche and was a candidate with the LaRouchite Curtin Labor Alliance, affiliated with the Citizens Electoral Council.

References

Australian Labor Party members of the Parliament of Australia
Members of the Australian House of Representatives for Swan
Members of the Australian House of Representatives
Australian trade unionists
1933 births
2006 deaths
LaRouche movement
20th-century Australian politicians